The 2007 TPG Tour was the inaugural season of the TPG Tour, the main professional golf tour in Argentina.

Five events were also part of the Tour de las Américas, the highest level tour in Latin America, and of those, the Coast Open and the Argentine Open were co-sanctioned by the Challenge Tour.

The Order of Merit was won by Rafael Gómez, ahead of Marco Ruiz in second, and Ángel Cabrera in third.

Schedule
The following table lists official events during the 2007 season.

Notes

References

Golf in Argentina
TPG Tour
TPG Tour